The 1916 Kansas State Farmers football team represented Kansas State Agricultural College—now known as Kansas State University—as a member of the Missouri Valley Conference (MVC) during the 1916 college football season. Led by first-year head coach Zora G. Clevenger, the Farmers compiled an overall record of 6–1–1 with a mark of 1–1–1 in conference play, placing fourth in the MVC.

Schedule

References

Kansas State
Kansas State Wildcats football seasons
Kansas State Farmers football